This is a list of notable Scottish rugby union players, not necessarily all of whom have represented the Scotland national rugby union team, arranged by decade, most recent first. Scottish players for other countries are included, e.g. Hefin O'Hare and Scotland caps who are notable for reasons other than being on the national rugby union team, e.g. Bill Gammell is better known as a businessman, and Norman Mair as a journalist.

Many players were active in two decades, and so are included in both listings.

By decade

2000s
 John Barr, shinty internationalist
 Hefin O'Hare

1980s
 David Changleng, referee
 Malcolm Changleng, referee
 Frank Hadden, coach

1970s
 Bill Gammell, businessman
 Dugald MacDonald, played for 
 Ian Robertson, commentator

1960s
 Ian Robertson, commentator
 Tremayne Rodd, 3rd Baron Rennell, politician
 Rob Valentine, rugby league player

1950s
 Charles Renilson

1920s
 J.M. Bannerman, Liberal politician
 PS Douty (1927 British Isles)
 R.G. Henderson (1924 British Isles)
 RF Kelly (1927 British Isles)
 DJ MacMyn (1927 British Isles)
 GA McIlwaine (1927 British Isles)
 EG Taylor (1927 British Isles)

1910s
 C.G. Timms (1910 British Isles)

1900s
 George Cunningham, governor
 J.C. Hosack (1903 British Isles)
 James Youll Turnbull, VC

1890s
 H.G.S. Gray (1899 British Isles)
 David Robertson, golfer

1880s
 H. Brooks (1888 British Isles)
R. Burnett (1888 British Isles)
W. Burnett (1888 British Isles)
Ned Haig, inventor of rugby sevens
A.J. Laing (1888 British Isles)
J. Smith (1888 British Isles)
Angus Stuart (1888 British Isles)

1870s
Hely Hutchinson Almond
Henry Renny-Tailyour

1860s
Hely Hutchinson Almond

Scottish cricket and rugby union players
These are people who have played both cricket and rugby at a high level.

Notes

References

Bibliography 
 .
  .
  .

 
Rugby